Oğulcan Kanmazalp (born 22 July 1992) is a Turkish chess player who holds the FIDE title of International Master (2010).

He was born in Izmir on 22 July 1992. After finishing the primary school in his hometown, he was educated in St. Joseph High School in Istanbul.

Oğulcan Kanmazalp began with chess playing at the age of eight. He was named FIDE Master (FM) in 2008, and International Master (IM) in 2010. he became in 2010 Turkish Chess champion. He is member of the national chess team.

Achievements
 2005 Turkish 14 Age Group - champion
 2005 Balkan Chess Games U20 - champion
 2007 Turkish 16 Age Group - second place
 2010 Turkish Championship - champion

References

External links
 
 
 
 

1992 births
Living people
People from İzmir
Turkish chess players
Chess International Masters
St. Joseph High School Istanbul alumni